Lady Killer (Serbo-Croatian: Дама која убија/Dama koja ubija) is a 1992 Yugoslavian film.

See also
Lists of Yugoslav films

External links
 
Yugoslav drama films
Serbian thriller films
1992 films
1990s erotic thriller films
Films set in Belgrade   
Serbo-Croatian-language films